Kostyantyn Piliyev (born 28 February 1983) is a Ukrainian weightlifter. He competed for Ukraine at the 2012 Summer Olympics.

References

Ukrainian male weightlifters
Weightlifters at the 2012 Summer Olympics
Olympic weightlifters of Ukraine
1983 births
People from Bilytske
Living people
Sportspeople from Donetsk Oblast
20th-century Ukrainian people
21st-century Ukrainian people